The Jidoaia is a right tributary of the river Voineșița in Romania. Its source is on the southeastern slope of Negovanu Mare peak, Lotru Mountains.

References

Rivers of Romania
Rivers of Vâlcea County